Elections to Aberdeenshire Council were held on 3 May 2007 the same day as the other Scottish local government elections and the Scottish Parliament general election. The election was the first one using 19 new wards created as a result of the Local Governance (Scotland) Act 2004, each ward would elect three or four councillors using the single transferable vote system a form of proportional representation. The new wards replaced 68 single-member wards which used the plurality (first past the post) system of election.

The council remained under no overall control and a coalition was formed between the Liberal Democrats and the Conservatives.

Results

Votes are the first preference votes.

Ward results

Banff and District (3 seats)

Troup (3 seats)

Fraserburgh and District (4 seats)

Central Buchan (4 seats)

Peterhead North and Rattray (4 seats)

Peterhead South and Cruden (3 seats)

Turriff and District (3 seats)

Mid-Formartine (4 seats)

Ellon and District (4 seats)

West Garioch (3 seats)

Inverurie and District (4 seats)

East Garioch (3 seats)

Westhill and District (4 seats)

Huntly, Strathbogie and Howe of Alford (4 seats)

Aboyne, Upper Deeside and Donside (3 seats)

Banchory and Mid-Deeside (3 seats)

North Kincardine (4 seats)

Stonehaven and Lower Deeside (4 seats)

Mearns (4 seats)

Changes Since 2007 Elections
†Cllr Ian Tait resigned from the SNP on 28 July 2008 and now sits as an Independent Scottish Nationalist.
††Cllr Debra Storr resigned from the Liberal Democrats on 18 November 2008 and on 5 March 2009 she joined the Scottish Green Party. She was a member of the Democratic Independent Group on the council.
†††Cllr Martin Ford resigned from the Liberal Democrats on 23 November 2008 and on 5 March 2009 he joined the Scottish Green Party. He is a member of the Democratic Independent Group on the council.
††††On 23 January 2009, Cllr Sam Coull resigned from the Liberal Democrats. Since 5 March 2009 he sits as a member of the Democratic Independent Group
†††††On 23 January 2009, Cllr Paul Johnston left the Liberal Democrat Council Group. He was subsequently expelled from the Liberal Democrats. Since 5 March 2009 he sits as a member of the Democratic Independent Group.
††††††Cllr Andy Ritchie resigned from the SNP on 1 April 2009 and now sits as an Independent.
†††††††Cllr Mark Cullen is also a member of the Democratic Independent Group on the council.
††††††††On 21 February 2012 Banff and District Cllr John Cox ceased to be an Independent and joined the Scottish National Party.

By-elections (2007-12)
There was a Troup by-election held on 1 May 2008 to fill the vacancy which arose with the death of the SNP's Michael Burnett on 4 February 2008. The by-election was won by the SNP's Bob Watson on 1 May 2008

There was an Aboyne, Upper Deeside and Donside by-election held on 23 April 2009 to fill the vacancy which arose with the resignation of the Conservative's Bruce Luffman in 2009. The by-election was won by the Liberal Democrat's Rosemary Bruce on 23 April 2009

Footnotes

External links
Aberdeenshire 2007 election results

2007
2007 Scottish local elections
21st century in Aberdeenshire